Elizabeth Cohen is an American journalist. Other people with this name include:
Elizabeth Cohen (engineer), American acoustical engineer
Elizabeth D. A. Cohen (1820–1921), American physician in Louisiana
Elizabeth F. Cohen (born 1973), American political scientist
Shaughnessy Cohen (born Elizabeth Shaughnessy Murray, 1948–1998), Canadian politician
Betty Comden (born Basya Cohen; 1917–2006), American dramatist, screenwriter, librettist, and songwriter

See also
Ruby and Elizabeth Cohen Woodlands, in Connecticut, United States